Plot drift, or narrative drift, is a phenomenon in storytelling in which the plot of the story deviates from its apparent initial direction. The phenomenon can affect written works, although it is often more noticeable in performed media such as television shows or movies. Plot drift is generally (though not always) seen as contrary to good storytelling technique.

A sign of plot drift can be the increased introduction of new characters and settings near the end of a story.

A contrary literary technique might include the apparent introduction of plot drift, only to later reveal a connection to the rest of the story.

Narratology